Sukhovsky 1-y is a rural locality (a khutor) in Tishanskoye Rural Settlement, Nekhayevsky District, Volgograd Oblast, Russia. The population was 30 as of 2010. There are 2 streets.

Geography 
Sukhovsky 1-y is located on the Kalach Upland, 10 km southwest of Nekhayevskaya (the district's administrative centre) by road. Sokolovsky is the nearest rural locality.

References 

Rural localities in Nekhayevsky District